Isaac Richard Harrison Gnanadason was inaugural Bishop of Kanyakumari; and the 5th Moderator of the Church of India.

Notes

 

Indian bishops
Anglican bishops of Kanyakumari
Indian Christian religious leaders
Living people
Moderators of the Church of South India
Year of birth missing (living people)